Robert Brandon Teilhet is a  Democrat member of the Georgia House of Representatives in the U.S. state of Georgia. He is a representing District 40, which encompasses parts of southeastern Cobb County.

Teilhet graduated from the University of Georgia (UGA) with a Bachelor of Arts (A.B.) degree in 1996 and a Juris Doctor (J.D.) from the UGA School of Law in 2000.

A member of the Georgia House of Representatives in Georgia, following a record of service in the Georgia House of Representatives, Teilhet was a 2010 candidate for Attorney General of the State of Georgia but lost the Democratic primary to Ken Hodges.

References

External links
Rob Teilhet for Attorney General
Rob Teilhet's official site
Georgia House of Representatives bio

Year of birth missing (living people)
Living people
People from Cobb County, Georgia
University of Georgia alumni
Democratic Party members of the Georgia House of Representatives
21st-century American politicians